Factory Benelux was the Belgian imprint of Factory Records, operated by Les Disques du Crépuscule from August 1980 until March 1988, releasing a large number of exclusive recordings as well as Benelux issues of regular Factory releases. The imprint was founded by Michel Duval and Annik Honoré. A detailed history of both Factory Benelux and Crépuscule can be found in the book Shadowplayers: The Rise & Fall of Factory Records by James Nice (Aurum Press, 2010).

Factory Benelux was reactivated in 2012 by James Nice for select reissues and special editions, as well as new recordings by original FBN artists.

See also
 Factory Records discography

References

Sources
 Factory Benelux Discography (Dennis Remmer)
 Factory Benelux: A Chronology (Frank Brinkhuis)
 Factory Benelux history at LTM (Frank Brinkhuis)

Record label discographies
 
 
Factory Records